Phani Bhusan Choudhury (born 1 May 1952) is an Indian politician from Assam, India. He has a distinct record of representing Bongaigaon constituency for the 8th consecutive time in the Assam Legislative Assembly since 1985. He was the Minister of Food and Civil Supplies and Consumer Affairs, Pension and Public Grievance, Government of Assam from 2018 to 2021 in the Sarbananda Sonowal ministry. Phani was the member of the Housing Committee of Assam Legislative Assembly, Member, Public Undertakings committee of Assam Legislative Assembly Minister from 1996 to 2001. He was also Chairman of Public Accounts Committee from 2009 to 2011 and leader of AGP legislature Party from 2011 to 2016. Choudhury is a leader of the regional outfit Asom Gana Parishad.

References

Asom Gana Parishad politicians
Living people
Assam MLAs 1985–1991
Assam MLAs 1991–1996
Assam MLAs 1996–2001
Assam MLAs 2001–2006
Assam MLAs 2006–2011
1952 births
People from Bongaigaon district